Suburban Melody (Spanish: Melodía de arrabal) is a 1933 American Pre-Code musical film directed by Louis J. Gasnier and starring Imperio Argentina, Carlos Gardel and Vicente Padula.

The film was made at the Joinville Studios in Paris by Paramount Pictures, who produced a large number of films in different languages at the studios. The film was made in Spanish, primarily for release in Spanish-speaking countries. Carlos Gardel appeared in a string of such productions during the 1930s. The film was extremely popular in Argentina, the native country of its three stars, where it was one of the highest-grossing releases.

Synopsis
After she hears his voice, a music teacher encourages a gambler to pursue a career as a professional singer. He enjoys success, but his former criminal connections threaten to wreck his progress.

Cast
 Imperio Argentina as Alina 
 Carlos Gardel as Roberto Ramírez  
 Vicente Padula as Gutiérrez  
 Jaime Devesa as Rancales 
 Helena D'Algy as Marga

References

Bibliography
 Bentley, Bernard. A Companion to Spanish Cinema. Boydell & Brewer, 2008. 
 Finkielman, Jorge. The Film Industry in Argentina: An Illustrated Cultural History. McFarland, 2003. 
 Nataša Durovicová, Kathleen E. Newman. World Cinemas, Transnational Perspectives. Routledge, 2010.

External links

1933 films
American musical films
1933 musical films
1930s Spanish-language films
Spanish-language American films
Films directed by Louis J. Gasnier
Paramount Pictures films
Films shot at Joinville Studios
American black-and-white films
1930s American films